XHGNS-FM is a radio station on 90.1 FM in Guerrero Negro, Baja California Sur.

History
XHGNS received its concession on September 27, 1993.

References

Radio stations in Baja California Sur
Radio stations established in 1993